Rossington was a Rock / Blues rock group formed by Gary Rossington, of Lynyrd Skynyrd fame, and his wife Dale Krantz-Rossington after the breakup of The Rossington-Collins Band.

History 

Gary and Dale married in 1982. Their marriage, in conjunction with the death of Allen Collins' wife and an unsuccessful second album, contributed to the demise of the Rossington-Collins Band.

The couple formed a new group, called The Rossington Band. The band released their debut album, Returned to the Scene of the Crime in 1986. Two years later, the band shortened its name to "Rossington" and released a second album, Love Your Man. After a 28 year hiatus, the album, Take It On Faith   was released in November 2016.

Gary Rossington died on March 5, 2023, at the age of 71.

Discography 

 Returned to the Scene of the Crime (1986)
 Love Your Man (1988)
 Take It On Faith (2016)

References

American blues rock musical groups
Musical groups established in 1982
Musical groups disestablished in 2023
1982 establishments in Florida
2023 disestablishments in Florida